His Highness Revathi Thirunal Balagopal Varma (b. 1953), son of Princess Uthram Thirunal Lalithamba Bayi (1923-2008) and Uthrittathi Nal Kerala Varma Koil Thampuran, is the titular Elayaraja of Travancore. Revathi Thirunal is the grandson of the last Regent Maharani of Travancore, H.H. Sree Padmanabhasevini Maharani Sree  Pooradom Thirunal Sethu Lakshmi Bayi. He is also the great great grandson of the legendary artist Raja Ravi Varma and brother of Rukmini Varma. His cousin is the novelist and writer Shreekumar Varma.

Revathi Thirunal is next in line to Moolam Thirunal Rama Varma the head of Thrippappur branch  The Royal Family of Travancore are custodians of the famous Sree Padmanabhaswamy Temple. He was educated at the Bishop Cotton Boys' School in Bangalore and at UC Berkeley where he completed his MBA in the 1970s before taking on family businesses. He is married to Vidya Varma and has a daughter, Samyuktha, and a son, Vikramaditya.

References

Living people
1953 births
Travancore royal family